Mirik meatballs (Mirik köfte) is a Turkish recipe of meatballs from Sivas province, eastern Central Anatolia Region, Turkey. This is one of the traditional dishes of Sivas. The ingredients are  bulgur, onion, eggs, salt, flour, yoghurt, butter, garlic, and red pepper.

See also 
 Harput meatballs
 Van köfte
 Sulu köfte

Notes and references 

http://www.kanald.com.tr/mutfagim/Haberler/Mirik-Koftesi-tarifi/46769.aspx
https://www.kolaylezzet.com/kolay-yemek-tarifleri/kofteler/118-mirik-koftesi-yogurt-soslu-bulgur-koftesi-sivas

Kofta